The 2020 AFC U-16 Championship would have been the 19th edition of the AFC U-16 Championship, the biennial international youth football championship organised by the Asian Football Confederation (AFC) for the men's under-16 national teams of Asia. It was scheduled to take place in Bahrain, who had been appointed as the host by the AFC on 17 September 2019. It was originally scheduled between 16 September and 3 October 2020, but was postponed twice due to the COVID-19 pandemic.

The AFC announced the cancellation of the tournament on 25 January 2021, leaving the hosting rights for the 2023 AFC U-17 Asian Cup with Bahrain.

Originally, the top four teams of the tournament would have qualified for the 2021 FIFA U-17 World Cup in Peru as the AFC representatives. Due to the ongoing COVID-19 Pandemic, the 2021 U-17 World Cup was also cancelled, with hosting rights for the 2023 FIFA U-17 World Cup still with Peru.

This edition was expected to be the last to be played as an under-16 tournament, as the AFC have proposed switching the tournament from under-16 to under-17 starting from 2023.

Japan were the defending champions.

Qualification

Qualifying was played from 14 – 22 September 2019. Bahrain also participated in the qualifiers, even though they had already qualified automatically as hosts.

Qualified teams
The following 16 teams qualified for the final tournament.

Draw
The draw of the final tournament was held on 18 June 2020, 14:30  MYT (UTC+8), at the AFC House in Kuala Lumpur. The 16 teams were drawn into four groups of four teams. The teams were seeded according to their performance in the 2018 AFC U-16 Championship final tournament and qualification, with the hosts Bahrain automatically seeded and assigned to Position A1 in the draw.

References

External links
, the-AFC.com
AFC U-16 Championship 2020, stats.the-AFC.com

 
2020 in Asian football
2020 in youth association football
2021 FIFA U-17 World Cup qualification
March 2021 sports events in Asia
April 2021 sports events in Asia
2020 Afc U-16 Championship
Association football events cancelled due to the COVID-19 pandemic